Megachile punctatissima is a species of bee in the family Megachilidae. It was described by Spinola in 1806.

References

Punctatissima
Insects described in 1806